Paul Josiah Devlin is an American sports editor and documentary filmmaker.

Education
Devlin is a B.A. graduate of the University of Michigan. While in high school he penned a now widely-shared - especially during the annual college admission season - 'I reject your rejection' letter to Harvard (and other colleges) that sent him rejections.

Career
A five-time Emmy winner for his work on NBC's Olympics and CBS's Tour de France, Devlin's films include Power Trip, which screened in 60 countries, theatrically across the United States and on PBS's Independent Lens, was nominated for an Independent Spirit Award, and has won 10 film festival awards, including top prizes at Berlin, Hot Docs-Toronto, and Florida.

Devlin also made the award-winning film SlamNation, which follows the fierce competition at the National Poetry Slam and helped popularize the dynamic genre with its release in theaters and on HBO/Cinemax and Encore/Starz. An interview with Devlin compromises an entire chapter in the book Words In Your Face: A Guided Tour through the New York City Poetry Slam, which refers to the movie as "Slam's Second Bible."

His second film - Power Trip - captures a clash of culture that combusts, when an American energy company, AES, must transform the dysfunctional electricity distribution system in Tbilisi, capital of the former Soviet Republic of Georgia.  Power Trip was nominated for the 2004 Independent Spirit Award for Best Documentary.  Power Trip is available on home and educational DVD, as well as for download on iTunes.

His film BLAST! follows a team of international astrophysicists led by Paul's brother, Dr. Mark Devlin, as they attempt to launch a telescope on a NASA high-altitude balloon.  BLAST! is currently available on DVD for home and educational release.  BLAST! is the first film to ever partner with the website ArtistShare - a website that allows fans to support the work of their favorite artists.

Devlin's latest film, The Front Man, is a documentary which follows the rock-and-roll career of the Loaded Poets, a band from North Brunswick, New Jersey.  The film documents the band's struggle for success and the member's continued dream of rock and roll fame.  The band also appeared in Devlin's first film, Rockin' Brunswick, which documented the 1980s New Brunswick music scene.
 
His other credits include his fiction film The Eyes of St. Anthony and his work as producing editor on the organic film FREESTYLE: The Art of Rhyme, broadcast on VH1 and winner of the Special Jury Award for Documentary Filmmaking at the Florida Film Festival.

As an editor, Devlin's credits include commercials, music videos, television shows, and major sports broadcasts, including CBS's Super Bowls and ABC/ESPN's World Cup Soccer.

Personal life
Devlin is married to Emily Raabe.

Director filmography
SlamNation
Power Trip
BLAST!
Freestyle: The Art of Rhyme
The Front Man
Slammin': The Sport of Spoken Word

References

External links

Himesh Patel reads a hilarious response to a university rejection letter - Letters Live on YouTube

American documentary filmmakers
Year of birth missing (living people)
Living people
University of Michigan alumni